Alexander Robertson (1878 – unknown) was a Scottish footballer. He was born in Dundee. His regular position was as a forward. He played for Dundee Violet, Dundee, Middlesbrough, Manchester United and Bradford Park Avenue.

References

External links
MUFCInfo.com profile

1878 births
Scottish footballers
Dundee F.C. players
Middlesbrough F.C. players
Manchester United F.C. players
Bradford (Park Avenue) A.F.C. players
Year of death missing
Dundee Violet F.C. players
Association football forwards